The Legend of Zelda is an action-adventure game franchise created by the Japanese game designers Shigeru Miyamoto and Takashi Tezuka. It is primarily developed and published by Nintendo, although some portable installments and re-releases have been outsourced to Flagship, Vanpool, and Grezzo. The gameplay incorporates action-adventure and elements of action RPG games.

The series centers on the various incarnations of Link, a courageous young man of the elf-like Hylian race; and Princess Zelda, a magical princess who is the mortal reincarnation of the goddess Hylia; as they fight to save the magical land of Hyrule from Ganon, an evil warlord turned demon king, who is the principal antagonist of the series. Ganon wishes to use the Triforce, a sacred relic left behind by the three goddesses that created Hyrule, to remake the world in his own dark image. When gathered together, the power of the Triforce can grant any wish its user desires; however, if someone with a heart that does not possess a balance of the three virtues of Power, Courage, and Wisdom attempts to touch the Triforce, it will split into three triangles and bond with three people whose hearts embody the required virtue.

Although their personalities and backstory differ from game to game, the incarnations of Link and Zelda often have many traits in common; such as Link often being left-handed and clad in green, and Zelda being associated with wisdom, light, and prophesy. While the conflict with Ganon serves as a backbone for the series, some games have featured other settings and antagonists, with Link traveling or being sent to these other lands in their time of need.

Since the original Legend of Zelda was released in 1986, the series has expanded to include 19 entries on all of Nintendo's major game consoles, as well as a number of spin-offs. An American animated TV series based on the games aired in 1989 and individual manga adaptations commissioned by Nintendo have been produced in Japan since 1997. The Legend of Zelda is one of Nintendo's most successful franchises; several of its entries are considered among the greatest video games of all time.

Gameplay 

The Legend of Zelda games feature a mix of puzzles, action, adventure/battle gameplay, and exploration. These elements have remained constant throughout the series, but with refinements and additions featured in each new game. Later games in the series also include stealth gameplay, where the player must avoid enemies while proceeding through a level, as well as racing elements. Although the games can be beaten with a minimal amount of exploration and side quests, the player is frequently rewarded with helpful items or increased abilities for solving puzzles or exploring hidden areas. Some items are consistent and appear many times throughout the series (such as bombs and bomb flowers, which can be used both as weapons and to open blocked or hidden doorways; boomerangs, which can kill or paralyze enemies; keys for locked doors; magic swords, shields, and bows and arrows), while others are unique to a single game. Though the games contain role-playing elements (Zelda II: The Adventure of Link is the only one to include an experience system), they emphasize straightforward hack-and-slash-style combat over the strategic, turn-based or active time combat of series like Final Fantasy. The game's role-playing elements, however, have led to much debate over whether or not the Zelda games should be classified as action role-playing games, a genre on which the series has had a strong influence. Miyamoto himself disagreed with the RPG label, but classified Zelda as "a real-time adventure game"; he said he was "not interested in systems where everything in the game is decided by stats and numbers" but what's "important to me is to preserve as much of that “live” feeling as possible" which he said "action games are better suited in conveying" to players.

Every game in the main Zelda series has consisted of three principal areas: an overworld which connects all other areas, in which movement is multidirectional, allowing the player some degree of freedom of action; areas of interaction with other characters (merely caves or hidden rooms in the first game, but expanding to entire towns and cities in subsequent games) in which the player gains special items or advice, can purchase equipment or complete side quests; and dungeons, areas of labyrinthine layout, usually underground, comprising a wide range of difficult enemies, bosses, and items. Each dungeon usually has one major item inside, which can be essential for solving many of the puzzles within that dungeon and often plays a crucial role in defeating that dungeon's boss, as well as progressing through the game. In nearly every Zelda game, navigating a dungeon is aided by locating a map, which reveals its layout, and a magic compass, which reveals the location of significant and smaller items such as keys and equipment. In later games, the dungeon includes a special "big key" that will unlock the door to battle the dungeon's boss enemy and open the item chest.

In most Zelda games, the player's HP or life meter is represented by a line of hearts, each heart typically representing two hit points. At the start of the game the player only has three hearts but players can increase their max hearts by finding heart-shaped crystals called "Heart Containers". Full heart containers are usually received at the end of dungeons and dropped by dungeon bosses. Smaller "Pieces of Heart" are awarded for completing side quests or found hidden around the game world in various places, and require a certain number (usually four) to form a full heart container. Health can be replenished by picking up hearts left by defeated enemies or destroyed objects, consuming items such as potions or food, or going to a Great Fairy Fountain to have the Great Fairy heal Link completely. Occasionally the player will find fairies hidden in specific locations; these fairies can either heal Link immediately or be kept in empty bottles, and will revive the player the next time they die.

The games pioneered a number of features that were to become industry standards. The original Legend of Zelda was the first console game with a save function that enabled players to stop playing and then resume later. The Legend of Zelda: Ocarina of Time introduced a targeting system that let the player lock the camera on to enemy or friendly NPCs which simplified 3D combat.

Inspiration 

The Legend of Zelda was principally inspired by Shigeru Miyamoto's "explorations" as a young boy in the hillsides, forests, and caves surrounding his childhood home in Sonobe, Japan where he ventured into forests with secluded lakes, caves, and rural villages. According to Miyamoto, one of his most memorable experiences was the discovery of a cave entrance in the middle of the woods. After some hesitation, he apprehensively entered the cave, and explored its depths with the aid of a lantern. Miyamoto has referred to the creation of the Zelda games as an attempt to bring to life a "miniature garden" for players to play with in each game of the series.

The story and setting was developed by Takashi Tezuka. Seeking to create a fairytale adventure game, Tezuka drew inspirations from fantasy books such as J. R. R. Tolkien's The Lord of the Rings. According to Keiji Terui, who wrote the backstory in the first game's manual, the location named Death Mountain was initially a working title for the legend of the Triforce which was written with inspirations from the battles of medieval Europe. The Master Sword was introduced as Excalibur in the French version of A Link to the Past, which originates from the legend of King Arthur in the Welsh collection of Mabinogion. Celtic mythology also inspired the name of Link's steed, Epona, based on the Celtic goddess of fertility.

Hearing of American novelist, socialite and painter Zelda Fitzgerald, Miyamoto thought the name sounded "pleasant and significant". Paying tribute, he chose to name the princess after her, and titled it The Legend of Zelda. Link and the fairy were inspired by Peter Pan and Tinker Bell. When making the series made the transition to 3D, the combat system of Ocarina of Time was based on the chanbara (samurai) style of Japanese sword fighting.

Audio 

Games in The Legend of Zelda series frequently feature in-game musical instruments, particularly in musical puzzles, which are widespread. Often, instruments trigger game events: for example, the recorder in The Legend of Zelda can reveal secret areas, as well as warp Link to the Dungeon entrances. This warping with music feature has also been used in A Link to the Past and Link's Awakening. In Ocarina of Time, playing instruments is a core part of the game, with the player needing to play the instrument through the use of the game controller to succeed. Ocarina of Time is "[one of the] first contemporary non-dance title[s] to feature music-making as part of its gameplay", using music as a heuristic device and requiring the player to utilise songs to progress in the game – a game mechanic that is also present in Majora's Mask.

"The Legend of Zelda Theme" is a recurring piece of music that was created for the first game of the franchise. The composer and sound director of the series, Koji Kondo, initially planned to use Maurice Ravel's Boléro as the game's title theme, but was forced to change it when he learned, late in the game's development cycle, that the copyright for the orchestral piece had not yet expired. As a result, Kondo wrote a new arrangement of the overworld theme within one day. The "Zelda Theme" has topped ScrewAttack's "Top Ten Videogame Themes Ever" list.

Up until Breath of the Wild, the Legend of Zelda series avoided using voice acting in speaking roles, relying instead on written dialogue. Series producer Eiji Aonuma previously stated that as Link is entirely mute, having the other characters speak while Link remains silent "would be off-putting". Instead of theme music for different locations, Breath of the Wild plays natural ambience around the player as main sounds, in addition to some minimalist piano music.

Plot

Setting 

The Legend of Zelda takes place predominantly in a medieval Western Europe-inspired fantasy world called Hyrule, which has developed a deep history and wide geography over the series's many releases. Much of the backstory of the creation of Hyrule was revealed in the games A Link to the Past, Ocarina of Time, The Wind Waker, Twilight Princess, Skyward Sword, and A Link Between Worlds. Hyrule's principal inhabitants are pointy-eared, elf-like humanoids called Hylians, which include the player character, Link, and the eponymous princess, Zelda.

The fictional universe established by the Zelda games sets the stage for each adventure. Some games take place in different lands with their own back-stories. Hytopia is a connected kingdom, Labrynna and Holodrum are different countries separate from the Kingdom of Hyrule, Termina and Lorule serve as parallel worlds, and Koholint is an island far away from Hyrule that appears to be part of a dream.

Story 

According to the in-game backstories, the world of Hyrule was created by the three golden goddesses: Din, Farore, and Nayru. Before departing, the goddesses left a sacred artifact called the Triforce, which could grant powers to the user. It physically manifests itself as three golden triangles in which each embodies one of the goddesses' virtues: Power, Courage, and Wisdom. However, because the Triforce has no will of its own and it can not judge between good and evil, it will grant any wish indiscriminately. Because of this, it was placed within an alternate world called the "Sacred Realm" or the "Golden Land" until one worthy of its power and has balanced virtues of Power, Wisdom, and Courage in their heart could obtain it, in its entirety. If a person is not of a balanced heart, the triforce part that the user mostly believes in will stay with that person and the remainder will seek out others. In order to master and control the triforce as a whole, the user must get the other parts found in other individuals and bring them together to reunite them. The Sacred Realm can itself be affected by the heart of those who enters it: those who are pure will make it a paradise, while those who are evil will transform it into a dark realm.

In Skyward Sword, the Triforce was sought by the Demon King Demise, an eternal being that had conquered time itself. After a long battle against the goddess Hylia, guardian of the Triforce, Demise was sealed away within her temple. Hylia, placing the Hylians on a floating island (called Skyloft) in the sky to protect them, orchestrated a means to stop the demon from escaping: creating the Goddess Sword (later becoming the Master Sword) for her chosen hero and discarding her divinity to be reborn among the people of Skyloft. In time, Zelda and Link (the reborn Hylia and her predestined warrior) enacted the goddess's plan and Demise was destroyed, but he vowed that his rage would be reborn and forever plague those descended from Link and Zelda. Following the establishment of Hyrule Kingdom, Demise's prophecy came to fruition in Ocarina of Time, when Ganondorf's attempt to get the Triforce scattered it with him gaining the Triforce of Power. The Triforce of Wisdom ended up with the Hylian princesses descended from Zelda, each named after her, while the Triforce of Courage is passed to a youth named Link across generations. While the Triforces of Power and Wisdom have been part of the series since the original The Legend of Zelda, it was only in Zelda II: The Adventure of Link that the Triforce of Courage was first introduced, being obtained by Link at the end of his quest. The Triforce, or even a piece of it, is not always distributed as a whole. Such as in The Wind Waker, Link must find all the pieces (called Triforce Shards) of the Triforce of Courage before he can return to Hyrule. Even in the original The Legend of Zelda, Zelda breaks her Triforce of Wisdom into 8 pieces for Link to find, before she was captured by Ganon.

Fictional chronology 

The chronology of the Legend of Zelda series was a subject of much debate among fans until an official timeline was released within the Hyrule Historia collector's book, first released in Japan in December 2011. Prior to its release, in a 2003 interview, series creator Shigeru Miyamoto confirmed the existence of an internal document which connected all the games, with series producer Eiji Aonuma later revealing in 2010 the confidential nature of this document, which only himself, Miyamoto, and the director of each game had access to.

In-game content, marketing material, and developer statements once partially established a timeline of the released installments: the original The Legend of Zelda was followed by Zelda II: The Adventure of Link as a direct sequel, which takes place several years later; A Link to the Past is a prequel to the previous two games, and was followed by Link's Awakening; Ocarina of Time is a prequel to A Link to the Past and takes the story many centuries back - according to character designer Satoru Takizawa, it was meant to implicitly tell the story of the Imprisoning War, and was followed by Majora's Mask as a direct sequel, set a few months later; Four Swords, upon its release, was considered the oldest tale in the series's chronology, predating Ocarina of Time; The Wind Waker takes place in one of the parallel timelines that emerged from Ocarina of Time, more than a century later, in the "adult era"; Four Swords Adventures, upon its release, was considered to be a direct sequel to Four Swords, set sometime after its events; The Minish Cap is a prequel to Four Swords, telling of the origins of villain Vaati and the creation of the Four Sword; Twilight Princess takes place in another of the parallel timelines that emerged from Ocarina of Time, more than a century later, in the "child era"; Phantom Hourglass is a direct sequel to The Wind Waker, and is followed by Spirit Tracks, which is set about a century later on a land far away from the setting of The Wind Waker. Skyward Sword precedes Ocarina of Time, telling the story of the creation of the Master Sword. A Link Between Worlds takes place six generations after A Link to the Past, and features the Triforce being reunited, and Ganon being resurrected; Tri Force Heroes is a direct sequel to A Link Between Worlds, which takes place several years later; Breath of the Wild takes place after all previous games in the series, without specifying a direct connection to any of the three timeline branches.

In the early 2000s, Nintendo of America released a timeline on the official website of the series as one of the possible interpretation of the events from all entries released up to that point, featuring a single protagonist named Link, the "Hero of Time" from its first adventure in Ocarina of Time. It was followed by Majora's Mask, A Link to the Past, Oracle of Seasons, Oracle of Ages, the original The Legend of Zelda, Zelda II: The Adventure of Link, and finally Link's Awakening In 2011, series translator Daniel Owsen revelead that, at one point, his coworkers at Nintendo of America and him conceived another complete timeline and intended to make it available online, but the Japanese series developers rejected the idea so that the placement of each game would be kept open to the imagination of the players.

On December 21, 2011, to celebrate 25th anniversary of the series, the Hyrule Historia art book was published by Shogakukan, which contained an official timeline of the fictional chronology of the series up to that point. This timeline subsequently posits that following Ocarina of Time, it splits into three alternate routes: in one, Link fails to defeat Ganon, leading into the Imprisoning War and A Link to the Past, Oracle of Seasons and Oracle of Ages, Link's Awakening (A Link Between Worlds and Tri Force Heroes were released after the timeline), The Legend of Zelda and The Adventure of Link. In the second and third, Link is successful, leading to a timeline split between his childhood (when Zelda sends him back in time so he can use the wisdom he has gained to warn Zelda in the past of the horrifying fate of Hyrule) and adulthood (where the Zelda from the future lives on to try and rebuild the kingdom). His childhood continues with Majora's Mask, followed by Twilight Princess and Four Swords Adventures. The timeline from his adult life continues into Wind Waker, Phantom Hourglass and Spirit Tracks.

In 2018, Nintendo revealed Breath of the Wild's timeline placement after all previous games in the series, without specifying a connection to any of the three timeline branches. Aonuma and Breath of the Wild director, Hidemaro Fujibayashi, justified the vague placement with the previous idea of keeping it open to players' imaginations. Nintendo also moved Link's Awakening to take place before Oracle of Seasons and Oracle of Ages. In November 2020, Nintendo released Hyrule Warriors: Age of Calamity, and marketed the game as a prequel to Breath of the Wild, being set 100 years before. However, the events of Age of Calamity diverged from the backstory established in Breath of the Wild, creating an alternate timeline separate from it.

Characters

Link 

The central protagonist of The Legend of Zelda series, Link is the name of various young male Hylians who characteristically wear a green tunic and a pointed cap, and are the bearers of the Triforce of Courage. In most games, the player can give Link a different name before the start of the adventure, and he will be referred by that given name throughout by the non-player characters (NPCs). In Link's Awakening, if the player steals from the shop, characters would later refer to him as "Thief". Miyamoto said in a 2002 interview that he named the protagonist "Link" because the character is/was supposed to be the "link" between the player and the game world that he (Miyamoto) had created. The various Links each have a special title, such as "Hero of Time", "Hero of the Winds" or "Hero chosen by the gods". Like many silent protagonists in video games, Link does not speak, only producing grunts, yells, or similar sounds. Despite the player not seeing the dialogue, it is referenced second-hand by in-game characters, showing that he is not, in fact, mute. Link is shown as a silent protagonist so that the audience is able to have their own thoughts as to how their Link would answer the characters instead of him having scripted responses.

Princess Zelda 

Princess Zelda is the princess of Hyrule and the guardian of the Triforce of Wisdom. Her name is present in many of her female ancestors and descendants. While most games require Link to save Zelda from Ganon, she sometimes plays a supporting role in battle, using magical powers and weapons such as Light Arrows to aid Link. With the exception of the CD-i games (which were not official Nintendo games), she was not playable in the main series until Spirit Tracks, where she becomes a spirit and can possess a Phantom Knight that can be controlled by the player. Zelda appears under various other aliases and alter egos, including Sheik (in Ocarina of Time) and Tetra (in The Wind Waker and Phantom Hourglass). In Skyward Sword, it is revealed that the Zelda of that game is a reincarnation of the goddess Hylia, whose power flows through the royal bloodline. The name "Zelda" derives from the American novelist Zelda Fitzgerald.

Ganon 

Ganon, also known as Ganondorf in his humanoid form, is the main antagonist and the final boss in the majority of The Legend of Zelda games. In the series, Ganondorf is the leader of a race of desert brigands called the Gerudo, which consists entirely of female warriors save for one man born every one hundred years. He is significantly taller than other human NPCs, but his looks vary between games, often taking the form of a monstrous anthropomorphic boar. His specific motives vary from game to game, but most often his plans include him kidnapping Princess Zelda and planning to achieve domination of Hyrule and presumably the world beyond it. To this end, he seeks the Triforce, a powerful magical relic. He often possesses a portion of the Triforce called the Triforce of Power, which gives him great strength. However, it is often not enough to accomplish his ends, leading him to hunt the remaining Triforce pieces. Unlike Link, Zelda, and most other recurring characters, he is actually the same person in every game, with the exception of Four Swords Adventures, where he is a reincarnation of the original. In each game the battles with him are different and he fights using different styles. The game Skyward Sword indicates that Ganon is a reincarnation of an evil deity known as Demise.

Development

1986–1997: 2D origins

The Legend of Zelda, the first game of the series, was first released in Japan on February 21, 1986, on the Famicom Disk System. A cartridge version for the Nintendo Entertainment System, using battery-backed memory, was released in the United States on August 22, 1987, and in Europe on November 27, 1987. The game features a "Second Quest", accessible either upon completing the game, or by registering one's name as "ZELDA" when starting a new quest. The "Second Quest" features different dungeons and item placement, and more difficult enemies. A modified version of the original Famicom game, BS Zelda no Densetsu, was released for the Super Famicom's satellite-based expansion, Satellaview, on August 6, 1995, in Japan. A second Satellaview game, BS Zelda no Densetsu MAP2 was released for the Satellaview on December 30 the same year. Both games featured rearranged dungeons, an altered overworld, and new voice-acted plot-lines.

The second game, Zelda II: The Adventure of Link, was released for the Famicom Disk System in Japan on January 14, 1987, and for the Nintendo Entertainment System in Europe in November and North America in December 1988. The game exchanged the top-down perspective for side-scrolling (though the top-down point of view was retained for overworld areas), and introduced RPG elements (such as experience points) not used previously or thereafter in the series. The Legend of Zelda and Zelda II were released in gold-colored cartridges instead of the console's regular grey cartridges. Both were re-released in the final years of the Nintendo Entertainment System with grey cartridges.

Four years later, A Link to the Past returned to the top-down view (under a 3/4 perspective), and added the concept of an alternate dimension, the Dark World. The game was released for the Super NES on November 21, 1991. A downloadable version of A Link to the Past and an exclusive modified version called BS Zelda no Densetsu Inishie no Sekiban were released on the Satellaview in Japan on March 2 and 30, 1997, respectively. A Link to the Past was re-released for the Game Boy Advance in 2002. The SNES version was later re-released on the Wii Virtual Console on January 22, 2007, on the Wii U Virtual Console, and on Nintendo Switch Online.

Three Zelda-themed LCD games were created between 1989 and 1992. The Zelda version of Nintendo's Game & Watch series was released first in August 1989 as a dual-screen handheld electronic game similar in appearance to today's Nintendo DS. It was re-released in 1998 as a Toymax, Inc. Mini Classic and was later included as an unlockable extra in Game & Watch Gallery 4, a 2002 compilation for the Game Boy Advance. While the Game & Watch Zelda was developed in-house by Nintendo, the subsequent two LCD games were developed by third parties under license by Nintendo. In October 1989, The Legend of Zelda was developed by Nelsonic as part of its Game Watch line. This game was an actual digital watch with primitive gameplay based on the original Legend of Zelda. In 1992, Epoch Co. developed Zelda no Densetsu: Kamigami no Triforce for its Barcode Battler II console. The game employed card-scanning technology similar to the later-released Nintendo e-Reader.

The next game, Link's Awakening, for Nintendo's Game Boy, is the first Zelda for a handheld, and the first set outside Hyrule and to exclude Princess Zelda. Link's Awakening was re-released, in full color, as a launch game for the Game Boy Color in 1998 as Link's Awakening DX. This remaster features additions such as an extra color-based dungeon and a photo shop that allows interaction with the Game Boy Printer. Link's Awakening DX was released on the 3DS' Virtual Console on June 7, 2011. An HD remake of Link's Awakening was released for the Nintendo Switch in 2019.

A series of video games was developed and released for the Philips CD-i in the early 1990s as a product of a compromise between Philips and Nintendo, after the companies failed to develop a CD-ROM peripheral for the Super NES. Created independently with no observation by or influence from Nintendo, the games are Link: The Faces of Evil and Zelda: The Wand of Gamelon, together with Zelda's Adventure. Nintendo never acknowledged them in the Zelda timeline, and they are considered to be in a separate, self-contained canon. These games are widely acknowledged to be the worst installments in the series, though have since gained a cult following in the form of internet memes.

1998–2001: Transition to 3D

After five years without a new game, the series made the transition to 3D with Ocarina of Time for the Nintendo 64, which was released in November 1998. This game, initially known as Zelda 64, retains the core gameplay of the previous 2D games, and was very successful commercially and critically, considered by many critics and gamers to be the best video game of all time, and ranking highly on IGN and EGM's "greatest games of all time" lists, as well as scoring perfect scores in several video game publications. In February 2006, it was ranked by Nintendo Power as the best game released for a Nintendo console. The game was originally developed for the poorly selling, Japanese-only 64DD, but was converted to cartridge format when the 64DD hardware was delayed. A new gameplay mechanic, lock-on targeting, is used in the game, which focuses the camera on a nearby target and alters the player's actions relative to that target. Such mechanics allow precise sword fighting in a 3D space. The game heavily uses context-sensitive button play, which enabled the player to control various actions with Link using only one button on the Nintendo 64's controller. Each action was handled slightly differently but all used the 'A' button to perform. For instance, standing next to a block and pressing 'A' made Link grab it (enabling him to push/pull it), but moving forwards into a block and pressing 'A' allowed Link to climb the block. The game featured the first appearance of Link's horse, Epona, allowing Link to travel quickly across land and fire arrows from horseback. Those who preordered the game received a gold-coloured cartridge in a limited edition box with a golden plastic card affixed, reading "Collector's Edition". In some stores that had this "Collector's Edition" quickly sell out, a small and rare Zelda pin was given instead. It is the sword and shield emblem with "Zelda" written on it. Very few of them are known to remain. Ocarina of Time was re-released on the GameCube in 2002, when it was offered as a pre-order incentive for The Wind Waker in the U.S., Canada and Japan. It includes the cancelled 64DD expansion for Ocarina of Time known as Ura Zelda during development. Named Ocarina of Time Master Quest, the game was given reorganized dungeon layouts for greater difficulty. Europe continued to receive this "Two-Game Bonus Disc" free in every copy of The Wind Waker, except for the discounted Player's Choice version. Ocarina of Time was available through the Wii's Virtual Console service. Nintendo re-released it for the Wii U Virtual Console in July 2015. Ocarina of Time 3D for the 3DS, featuring remade graphics and stereoscopic 3D, was released in mid-June 2011. Ocarina of Time has been made available on the higher tier of Nintendo Switch Online in HD resolution.

Ocarina of Times follow-up, Majora's Mask, was released in April 2000. It uses the same 3D game engine as the previous game, and added a time-based concept, in which Link, the protagonist, relives the events of three days as many times as needed to complete the game's objectives. It was originally called Zelda Gaiden, a Japanese title that translates as Zelda Side story. Gameplay changed significantly; in addition to the time-limit, Link can use masks to transform into creatures with unique abilities. While Majora's Mask retains the graphical style of Ocarina of Time, it is also a departure, particularly in its atmosphere. It features motion-blur, unlike its predecessor. The game is darker in tone, dealing with death and tragedy in a manner not previously seen in the series, and has a sense of impending doom, as a large moon slowly descends upon the land of Termina to destroy all life. All copies of Majora's Mask are gold cartridges. A limited "Collector's Edition" lenticular cartridge label was offered as the pre-order incentive. Copies of the game that are not collector's editions feature a normal sticker cartridge label. Majora's Mask was available on the Wii and Wii U Virtual Console catalogues. The Legend of Zelda: Majora's Mask 3D was released for 3DS in North America and Europe on February 13, 2015, and in Japan and Australia a day later. The Nintendo 64 version was added to Nintendo Switch Online in February 2022; with this, all of the 3D games in the series have been re-released in HD resolution.

Oracle of Seasons and Oracle of Ages were released simultaneously for the Game Boy Color, and interact using passwords or a Game Link Cable. After one game has been completed, the player is given a password that allows the other game to be played as a sequel. They were developed by Flagship in conjunction with Nintendo, with supervision from Miyamoto. After the team experimented with porting the original The Legend of Zelda to the Game Boy Color, they decided to make an original trilogy to be called the "Triforce Series". When the password system linking the three games proved too troublesome, the concept was reduced to two games at Miyamoto's suggestion. These two games became Oracle of Ages, which is more puzzle-based, and Oracle of Seasons, which is more action-oriented. Both titles were later released on the 3DS Virtual Console.

2002–2005: Introduction of Toon Link and multiplayer 

The Game Boy Advance release of A Link to the Past in 2002 featured a new game, Four Swords, the first multiplayer Zelda. This game introduced Toon Link, a name first used in Super Smash Bros. Brawl to refer to cartoon-based visual designs of Link. Four Swords Anniversary Edition was released on September 28, 2011 as free DSiWare available until February 20, 2012. 

When Nintendo revealed the GameCube on August 24, 2000, the day before Nintendo's Space World 2000 exposition, a software demonstration showed a realistically styled real-time duel between Ganondorf and Link. Fans and the media speculated that the battle might be from a Zelda game in development at the time. At SpaceWorld 2001, Nintendo showed a cel-shaded Zelda game, later released as The Wind Waker in December 2002. Due to poor reception, nothing further was shown until a playable demonstration was ready. Miyamoto felt The Wind Waker would "extend Zeldas reach to all ages". The gameplay centres on controlling wind with a baton called the "Wind Waker" and sailing a small boat around an island-filled ocean, retaining similar gameplay mechanics as the previous 3D games in the series. The Legend of Zelda: Collector's Edition, released for the GameCube in 2003, included the original The Legend of Zelda, Zelda II, Ocarina of Time, Majora's Mask, and a demo of The Wind Waker. The Legend of Zelda: The Wind Waker HD was released for Wii U in 2013.

Four Swords Adventures was released for the GameCube in early 2004 in Japan and America, and January 2005 in Europe. Based on the handheld Four Swords, Four Swords Adventures was another deviation from previous Zelda gameplay, focusing on level-based and multiplayer gameplay. The game contains 24 levels and a map screen; there is no connecting overworld. For multiplayer features, each player must use a Game Boy Advance system linked to the GameCube via a Nintendo GameCube – Game Boy Advance link cable. The game features a single-player campaign, in which using a Game Boy Advance is optional. Four Swords Adventures includes two gameplay modes: "Hyrulean Adventure", with a plot and gameplay similar to other Zelda games, and "Shadow Battle", in which multiple Links, played by multiple players, battle each other. The Japanese and Korean versions include an exclusive third segment, "Navi Trackers" (originally designed as the stand-alone game "Tetra's Trackers"), which contains spoken dialogue for most of the characters, unlike other games in The Legend of Zelda series.

In November 2004 in Japan and Europe, and January 2005 in America, Nintendo released The Minish Cap for the Game Boy Advance. In The Minish Cap Link can shrink in size using a mystical, sentient hat named Ezlo. While shrunk, he can see previously explored parts of a dungeon from a different perspective, and enter areas through otherwise-impassable openings. It was later released on the Wii U Virtual Console.

2006–2011: Motion and touch-based swordplay

In November 2006, Twilight Princess was released as the first Zelda game on the Wii, and later in December as the last Nintendo-published game for the GameCube, the console for which it was originally developed. The Wii version features a reversed world where everything that is in the west on the GameCube is in the east on the Wii. The display is mirrored in order to make Link right-handed to make use of the Wii Remote feel more natural for the majority of players. The game chronicles the struggle of a young adult Link to confront the troubles of the "Twilight Realm", a mysterious force that appears around and interacts with Hyrule. When he enters this realm, he is transformed into a wolf, and loses the ability to use his sword, shield or other items, but gains other abilities such as sharpened senses from his new form. Twilight Princess includes an incarnation of Link's horse, Epona, for fast transportation, and features mounted battle scenarios including boss battles that were not seen in previous games. Twilight Princess diverted from the cel-shading of Wind Waker, integrating graphics featuring more detailed textures, giving the game a darker atmosphere. The Legend of Zelda: Twilight Princess HD released for Wii U in 2016.

At 2006 Game Developers Conference, a new title Phantom Hourglass for the Nintendo DS was shown. It revealed traditional top-down Zelda gameplay optimised for the DS's features, with a cel-shaded 3D graphical style similar to The Wind Waker for Gamecube. The game is a direct sequel to The Wind Waker. Phantom Hourglass was released in June 2007, for Japan and October for North America and Europe. It was later released on the Wii U Virtual Console.

The next Legend of Zelda for the DS, The Legend of Zelda: Spirit Tracks, was released in December 2009. In this game, the "spirit tracks", railroads which chain an ancient evil, are disappearing from Hyrule. Zelda and Link go to the 'Spirit Tower' (the ethereal point of convergence for the tracks) to find out why, but villains steal Zelda's body for the resurrection of the Demon King. Rendered disembodied, Zelda is left a spirit, and only Link (and a certain few sages) can see her. Together they go on a quest to restore the spirit tracks, defeat the Demon King, and return Zelda to her body. Using a modified engine of that used in Phantom Hourglass, the notably new feature in this game is that the Phantom Guardians seen in Phantom Hourglass are, through a series of events, periodically controllable. It was the first time in the series that both Link and Zelda work together on the quest. It was later released on the Wii U Virtual Console.

A new Zelda game for Wii was in development since the end of 2000s. The new title was revealed at E3 2010 as Skyward Sword, but its release was delayed to 2011. The game, the earliest in the Legend of Zelda timeline, reveals the origins of Hyrule, Ganon and many elements featured in previous games; it uses Wii's MotionPlus feature as well. It was released on November 20, 2011; the first run included a 25th Anniversary CD of fully orchestrated music from various Zelda games, including Skyward Sword. It was made available for download on Wii U in September 2016. The Legend of Zelda: Skyward Sword HD, with optional button-only controls, released for Nintendo Switch in 2021.

2013–present: Open-world emphasis

In 2013, Nintendo released The Legend of Zelda: A Link Between Worlds for the Nintendo 3DS, a sequel to A Link to the Past. Progression is more open-ended than previous titles, with the possibility of completing many of the game's dungeons in any order. Certain dungeon obstacles require the use of rented or purchased items.

The Legend of Zelda: Tri Force Heroes, a cooperative multiplayer game, was released for the 3DS in October 2015. It features the same Link as A Link Between Worlds but lacks open-world gameplay.

While Nintendo had showcased a Wii U demo reel at E3 2011 that depicted Link fighting a monster in HD and the first original HD Zelda game was scheduled for a 2015 release, it was delayed. The title was finally revealed at E3 2016 as Breath of the Wild, and the game was released on March 3, 2017 as the last Nintendo-published game for the Wii U and a launch title for the Nintendo Switch. Similar to the original The Legend of Zelda, players are given little instruction and can explore the world freely. The world is designed to encourage exploration and experimentation and the main story quest can be completed in a nonlinear fashion.

A Breath of the Wild sequel, The Legend of Zelda: Tears of the Kingdom, is scheduled for release on the Switch on May 12, 2023.

Other games

Cancelled games 
Throughout the lifespan of The Legend of Zelda series, a number of games (including main series games as well as re-releases and spin-offs) in varying states of completeness have had their releases cancelled. Perhaps the earliest of these was Gottlieb's The Legend of Zelda Pinball Machine (cancelled 1993). After securing a license from Nintendo to produce two Nintendo-franchise-based pinball machines, pinball designer Jon Norris was tasked with designing the table. Before it was completed, Gottlieb decided to repurpose the game with an American Gladiators theme. Licensing for this version ultimately fell through and the game was released as simply Gladiators (November 1993).

In 1998, Nintendo cancelled Ura Zelda, the Ocarina of Time expansion disk for the 64DD due to poor sales figures for the 64DD peripheral. In 2002, Nintendo released a GameCube bonus disc called The Legend of Zelda: Ocarina of Time Master Quest. It contains emulated versions of Ocarina of Time and Ocarina of Time Master Quest, which Aonuma and Miyamoto each confirmed is Ura Zelda.

In 2001, under license from Nintendo, Capcom cancelled the release of The Legend of Zelda: Mystical Seed of Courage for Game Boy Color. Working with Capcom's subsidiary Flagship, Yoshiki Okamoto was originally tasked with designing a series of three Zelda games for the Game Boy Color. Referred to as the "Triforce Series", the games were known as The Legend of Zelda: The Mysterious Acorn: Chapter of Power, Chapter of Wisdom, and Chapter of Courage in Japan and The Legend of Zelda: Mystical Seed of Power, Mystical Seed of Wisdom, and Mystical Seed of Courage in the US. The games were to interact using a password system, but the limitations of this system and the difficulty of coordinating three games proved too complicated, so the team scaled back to two games at Miyamoto's suggestion. The Legend of Zelda: Oracle of Seasons was adapted from Mystical Seed of Power, The Legend of Zelda: Oracle of Ages was adapted from Mystical Seed of Wisdom, and Mystical Seed of Courage was cancelled.

Before its 2006 release, both Link and Samus from the Metroid series were planned to be playable characters for the Wii version of Marvel: Ultimate Alliance, but they didn't make the final release because they weren't Marvel characters.

In 2011, an unnamed Zelda 25th Anniversary Compilation was cancelled. To celebrate the 25th anniversary of the series, Nintendo of America originally had planned to release a compilation of games together for the Wii, similar to the collector's edition disc released for the GameCube in 2003. Nintendo of Japan's president Satoru Iwata and Shigeru Miyamoto decided against releasing it, believing it would be too similar to the Super Mario 25th Anniversary collection released in 2010.

Retro Studios had two Zelda games in development. One was an untitled game starring a Sheikah in a story that explores the origins of the Master Sword. Another one was titled Heroes of Hyrule and it starred a Goron, a Zora, and a Rito who set out to rescue Link.

Spin-off games 
As the franchise has grown in popularity, several games have been released that are set within or star a minor character from the universe of The Legend of Zelda but are not directly connected to the main The Legend of Zelda series. Both map versions of the game BS Zelda no Densetsu for the Satellaview (released in August and December 1995) could be considered spin-offs due to the fact that they star the "Hero of Light" (portrayed by either the Satellaview's male or female avatar) as opposed to Link as the protagonist of Hyrule. A third Satellaview game released in March 1997, BS Zelda no Densetsu Inishie no Sekiban (BS The Legend of Zelda: Ancient Stone Tablets) could also be considered a spin-off for the same reason. Other spin-off games include Freshly-Picked Tingle's Rosy Rupeeland for the Nintendo DS – an RPG released in September 2006 in Japan (Summer of 2007 in the UK) to star supporting character Tingle. A second Tingle game is Tingle's Balloon Fight DS for the Nintendo DS. Here Tingle again stars in this spin-off arcade style platformer, released in April 2007 only in Japan and available solely to Platinum Club Nintendo members.

In addition to games in which Link does not star as the protagonist, games such as the shooter game, Link's Crossbow Training (for the Wii), have been considered spin-offs due to the lack of a traditional "Save Hyrule" plot-line. Released in November 2007 as a bundle with the Wii Zapper, this game allows players to assume the identity of Link as he progresses through a series of tests to perfect his crossbow marksmanship. Color Changing Tingle's Love Balloon Trip was released in Japan in 2009 as a sequel to Freshly-Picked Tingle's Rosy Rupeeland.

Hyrule Warriors, a crossover game combining the setting of Nintendo's The Legend of Zelda series and the gameplay of Tecmo Koei's Dynasty Warriors series, was released in North America in September 2014 for Wii U. Hyrule Warriors Legends, a version for the Nintendo 3DS containing more content and gameplay modifications, was released in March 2016.

To commemorate the launch of the My Nintendo loyalty program in March 2016, Nintendo released My Nintendo Picross: The Legend of Zelda: Twilight Princess, a Picross puzzle game developed by Jupiter for download to the Nintendo 3DS.

Cadence of Hyrule, developed by Brace Yourself Games and released on June 13, 2019, is an officially licensed crossover of Zelda with Crypt of the NecroDancer.

Hyrule Warriors: Age of Calamity, developed by Koei Tecmo, shares the hack-and-slash style of the spin-off game Hyrule Warriors. Age of Calamity was released in November 2020.

A new Zelda-themed variant of Vermin was included on the limited edition Game & Watch: The Legend of Zelda unit, which also included The Legend of Zelda, The Adventure of Link, and Link’s Awakening.

Reception

The Legend of Zelda series has received outstanding levels of acclaim from critics and the public. Ocarina of Time, The Wind Waker, Skyward Sword, and Breath of the Wild have each received a perfect 40/40 score (10/10 by four reviewers) by Japanese Famitsu magazine, making Zelda one of the few series with multiple perfect scores. Ocarina of Time was even listed by Guinness World Records as the highest-rated video game in history, citing its Metacritic score of 99 out of 100. Computer and Video Games awarded The Wind Waker and Twilight Princess a score of 10/10. A Link to the Past has won Gold Award from Electronic Gaming Monthly. In Nintendo Powers Top 200 countdown in 2004, Ocarina of Time took first place, and seven other Zelda games placed in the top 40. Twilight Princess was named Game of the Year by X-Play, GameTrailers, 1UP, Electronic Gaming Monthly, Spacey Awards, Game Informer, GameSpy, Nintendo Power, IGN, and many other websites. The editors of review aggregator websites GameRankings, IGN and Metacritic have all given Ocarina of Time their highest aggregate scores. Game Informer has awarded The Wind Waker, Twilight Princess, Skyward Sword, A Link Between Worlds and Breath of the Wild with scores of 10/10. Phantom Hourglass was named DS Game of the Year by IGN and GameSpy. Airing in December 2011, Spike TV's annual Video Game Awards gave the series the first ever "Hall of Fame Award", which Miyamoto accepted in person. Ocarina of Time and its use of melodic themes to identify different game regions has been called a reverse of Richard Wagner's use of leitmotifs to identify characters and themes. Ocarina of Time was so well received that sales increased for real ocarinas. IGN praised the music of Majora's Mask for its brilliance despite its heavy use of MIDI. It has been ranked the seventh-greatest game by Electronic Gaming Monthly, whereas Ocarina of Time was ranked eighth. The series won GameFAQs Best Series Ever competition.

, The Legend of Zelda franchise has sold over 130 million copies, with the original The Legend of Zelda being the fourth best-selling NES game of all time. The series was ranked as the 64th top game (collectively) by Next Generation in 1996. In 1999, Next Generation listed the Zelda series as number 1 on their "Top 50 Games of All Time", commenting that Zelda series had always more gameplay and innovations than most other titles in their series. According to British film magazine Empire, with "the most vividly-realised world and the most varied game-play of any game on any console, Zelda is a solid bet for the best game series ever".

Legacy 

Multiple members of the game industry have expressed how Zelda games have impacted them, including Rockstar Games founder and Grand Theft Auto director, Dan Houser, who said that Zelda and Mario games on Nintendo 64 greatly influenced them in developing Grand Theft Auto series, as well in other 3D games in general. Rockstar founder and Grand Theft Auto director Sam Houser also cited the influence of Zelda, describing Grand Theft Auto III as "Zelda meets Goodfellas". Ōkami director Hideki Kamiya (Capcom, PlatinumGames) said that he has been influenced by The Legend of Zelda series in developing the game, citing A Link to the Past as his favorite game of all time. Soul Reaver and Uncharted director, Amy Hennig (Crystal Dynamics and Naughty Dog), cited Zelda as inspiration for the Legacy of Kain series, noting A Link to the Pasts influence on Blood Omen and Ocarina of Times influence on Soul Reaver. Soul Reaver and Uncharted creator, Richard Lemarchand (Crystal Dynamics and Naughty Dog), also cited A Link to the Pasts approach to combining gameplay with storytelling as inspiration for Soul Reaver. Wing Commander and Star Citizen director, Chris Roberts (Origin Systems and Cloud Imperium Games), cited Zelda as an influence on his action role-playing game, Times of Lore.

Dark Souls series creator Hidetaka Miyazaki named A Link To The Past as one of his favorite role-playing video games. Miyazaki also described The Legend of Zelda as a sort of textbook for 3D action games. Ico director Fumito Ueda cited Zelda as an influence on Shadow of the Colossus. Peter Molyneux (Lionhead Studios and Microsoft Studios) stated that the Twilight Princess is one of his favorite games and an influence for the Fable series. Darksiders director David Adams (Vigil Games) cited Zelda as an influence on his work. Prince of Persia and Assassin's Creed director Raphael Lacoste cited The Wind Waker as an influence on Assassin's Creed IV: Black Flag. CD Projekt Red cited the Zelda series as an influence on The Witcher 3: Wild Hunt. Majora's Mask served as the primary influence on Alex Hall's web series Ben Drowned. Final Fantasy and The 3rd Birthday director Hajime Tabata cited Ocarina of Time as inspiration for the open world of Final Fantasy XV.

 Cross-overs 
The Legend of Zelda series has crossed over into other Nintendo and third-party video games, most prominently in the Super Smash Bros. series of fighting games published by Nintendo. Link appears as a fighter in Super Smash Bros. for the Nintendo 64, the first entry in the series, and is part of the roster in all subsequent releases in the series as well. Zelda (who is able to transform into Sheik as well), Ganondorf, and Young Link (the child version of Link from Ocarina of Time) were added to the player roster for Super Smash Bros. Melee, and appeared in all subsequent releases except for "Young Link" (who is later replaced by "Toon Link" from The Wind Waker, in subsequent releases Super Smash Bros. Brawl and Super Smash Bros. for Nintendo 3DS and Wii U). Both Young Link and Toon Link appear in the fifth installment, Super Smash Bros. Ultimate. Other elements from the series, such as locations and items, are also included throughout the Smash Bros. series. Outside of the series, Nintendo allowed for the use of Link as a playable character exclusively in the GameCube release of Namco's fighting game Soulcalibur II.

 Link, using a design based on Skyward Sword, appears as a playable character in Mario Kart 8 via downloadable content (DLC), along with a "Hyrule Circuit" racetrack themed on The Legend of Zelda series. The first pack is named after the series. In a post-launch update for Mario Kart 8 Deluxe, Link and his vehicle received alternate styles based on Breath of the Wild.
 In the Wii U version of Sonic Lost World, a DLC stage based on The Legend of Zelda series was released in March 2014, named "The Legend of Zelda Zone". It was built around the core gameplay mechanics of Sonic Lost World, with some elements from the Zelda series, including a heart-based vitality meter, rupee collection, and a miniature dungeon to explore.

 In other media 

 TV series 

A 13-episode American animated TV series, adapted by DiC and distributed by Viacom Enterprises, aired in 1989. The animated Zelda shorts were broadcast each Friday, instead of the usual Super Mario Bros. cartoon which was aired during the rest of the week. The series loosely follows the two NES Zelda games (the original The Legend of Zelda and The Adventure of Link), mixing settings and characters from those games with original creations. The show's older incarnations of both Link and Zelda appeared in various episodes of Captain N: The Game Master during its second season.

A live-action television series had been in development around 2015, as reported from an anonymous Netflix employee to The Wall Street Journal. The program was a joint effort between Netflix and Nintendo, and was said to be aimed as a family-friendly version of Game of Thrones. Further details of this series went sparse until 2021 when Adam Conover gave an interview regarding his College Humor period. There, the College Humor team had been planning a skit that would have combined Star Fox with Fantastic Mr. Fox and had even had talked to Miyamoto on the project. Conover said that they were told about a month into the project that Nintendo had requested they stop all work on the project as a result of the leak related to the live-action Zelda show; Nintendo, already protective of its IP, had pulled many external projects including the live-action show.

 Print media 
Valiant Comics released a short series of comics featuring characters and settings from the Zelda cartoon as part of their Nintendo Comics System line. Manga adaptations of many entries in the series, including A Link to the Past, Ocarina of Time, Majora's Mask, Oracle of Seasons and Oracle of Ages, Four Swords Adventures, The Minish Cap, Phantom Hourglass, and Twilight Princess have been produced under license from Nintendo, primarily written and drawn by Japanese artist duo Akira Himekawa. These adaptations do not strictly follow the plot of the games from which they are based and may contain additional story elements.

A number of official books, novels, and gamebooks have been released based on the series as well. The earliest was Moblin's Magic Spear, published in 1989 by Western Publishing under their Golden Books Family Entertainment division and written by Jack C. Harris. It took place sometime during the first game. Two gamebooks were published as part of the Nintendo Adventure Books series by Archway, both of which were written by Matt Wayne. The first was The Crystal Trap (which focuses more on Zelda) and the second was The Shadow Prince. Both were released in 1992. A novel based on Ocarina of Time was released in 1999, written by Jason R. Rich and published by Sybex Inc. under their Pathways to Adventure series. Another two gamebooks were released as part of the You Decide on the Adventure series published by Scholastic. The first book was based on Oracle of Seasons and was released in 2001. The second, based on Oracle of Ages, was released in 2002. Both were written by Craig Wessel. In 2006, Scholastic released a novel as part of their Nintendo Heroes series, Link and the Portal of Doom. It was written by Tracey West and was set shortly after the events of Ocarina of Time.

In 2011, to coincide with the 25th anniversary of the series, an art book was published exclusively in Japan under the name Hyrule Historia by Shogakukan. It contains concept art from the series's conception to the release of Skyward Sword in 2011 and multiple essays about the production of the games, as well as an overarching timeline of the series. It also includes a prequel manga to Skyward Sword by Akira Himekawa. The book received an international release by publisher Dark Horse Comics on January 29, 2013; it took the number one spot on Amazon's sales chart, taking the spot away from E. L. James's 50 Shades of Grey trilogy. Dark Horse released The Legend of Zelda: Art & Artifacts, a follow-up art book to Hyrule Historia containing additional artwork and interviews, in North America and Europe in February 2017.

 Music 
Taking place in Cologne, Germany, on September 23, 2010, the video game music concert Symphonic Legends focused on music from Nintendo and, among others, featured games such as The Legend of Zelda. Following an intermission, the second half of the concert was entirely dedicated to an expansive symphonic poem dedicated to the series. The 35-minute epic tells the story of Link's evolution from child to hero.

To celebrate the 25th anniversary of the series in 2011, Nintendo commissioned an original symphony, The Legend of Zelda: Symphony of the Goddesses. The show was originally performed in the fall of 2011 in Los Angeles and consists of live performances of much of the music from the series. It has since been scheduled for 18 shows so far throughout the United States and Canada. Nintendo released a CD, The Legend of Zelda 25th Anniversary Special Orchestra CD. Featuring eight tracks from live performances of the symphony, the CD is included alongside the special edition of The Legend of Zelda: Skyward Sword for the Wii. Nintendo later celebrated The Legend of Zelda 30th anniversary with an album which was released in Japan in February 2017.

 Merchandise 
The Legend of Zelda-themed Monopoly board game was released in the United States in September 2014. A Clue board game in the style of The Legend of Zelda series was released in June 2017. A UNO-styled The Legend of Zelda game was released in February 2018, exclusively at GameStop in North America. A limited edition Zelda 25th anniversary 3DS was released on December 1, 2011, in Australia.

 Potential films 
In 2007, Imagi Animation Studios, which had provided the animation for TMNT and Astro Boy, created a pitch reel for a computer-animated The Legend of Zelda movie. Nintendo did not accept the studio's offer due to the memory of the failure of the 1993 live-action movie adaption of Super Mario Bros. In 2013, Aonuma stated that, if development of a film began, the company would want to use the opportunity to embrace audience interaction in some capacity.

 Notes 

Group n

 References Works cited'

External links 

 

 
Action-adventure games
Video games about magic
Action-adventure video games by series
Nintendo franchises
Video games adapted into comics
Video games produced by Shigeru Miyamoto
Video game franchises
Video game franchises introduced in 1986